Gayle Jenkins, Lady Jenkins (née Hunnicutt; born February 6, 1943) is an American retired film, television and stage actress. She has made more than 30 film appearances.

Early life and education
The daughter of Colonel Sam Lloyd Hunnicutt and Mary Virginia (née Dickerson) Hunnicutt, she was born in Fort Worth, Texas. Hunnicutt attended the University of California, Los Angeles on a scholarship to study English literature and theatre. She worked as a fashion model, then became an actress.

Career

Acting
During her film career, Hunnicutt was typecast as a brunette sexpot. She portrayed Emaline Fetty, a con woman trying to extort money from the Clampetts in two episodes of The Beverly Hillbillies in 1966. She co-starred with James Garner in the detective film Marlowe (1969), in which her character was a glamorous Hollywood actress.

After she moved to England with husband David Hemmings in 1970, Hunnicutt was able to use the finer range of her acting. She and Hemmings co-starred in two horror films in the early 1970's, Fragment of Fear (1970) and Voices (1973).  She had a prominent role as Charlotte Stant in Jack Pulman's television adaptation of Henry James's novel The Golden Bowl (1972). She played Lionel's wife in The Legend of Hell House (1973) and Tsarina Alexandra in the television miniseries Fall of Eagles (1974). She appeared as Irene Adler, opposite Jeremy Brett, in the first episode of the TV series The Adventures of Sherlock Holmes ("A Scandal in Bohemia", 1984). She also appeared in another Marlowe mystery in an episode of HBO's Philip Marlowe, Private Eye (1983), this time starring Powers Boothe. She had a supporting role in the thriller Target (1985), co-starring Gene Hackman and Matt Dillon. Hunnicutt returned to the United States in 1989 to play the role of Vanessa Beaumont in Dallas until 1991.

In 2012, Hunnicutt was featured in an episode of the HGTV reality show Selling London.

Writing
Hunnicutt has written two books. The first, Health and Beauty in Motherhood, was published in 1984. In 2004, she published Dearest Virginia: Love Letters from a Cavalry Officer in the South Pacific, which contains the letters exchanged by her parents during World War II.

Personal life 
On November 16, 1968, Hunnicutt married British actor David Hemmings, with whom she had a son, the actor Nolan Hemmings; they divorced in 1975. Hunnicutt married journalist Simon Jenkins in 1978. The couple lived in Primrose Hill, London, where they raised their son Edward. Jenkins was appointed a Knight Bachelor for services to journalism in the 2004 New Year honours. They divorced in 2009. In 2010, she started dating Richard Evans, tennis correspondent of The Daily Telegraph.

Filmography 

The Wild Angels (1966) as Suzie 
P.J. (1968) as Maureen Preble
The Smugglers (1968 TV film) as Adrianna
Eye of the Cat (1969) as Kassia Lancaster
Marlowe (1969) as Mavis Wald
Fragment of Fear (1970) as Juliet Bristow
Freelance (1971) as Chris
The Love Machine (1971) as Astrological girl at party (uncredited)
Running Scared (1972) as Ellen Case
Voices (1973) as Claire
Scorpio (1973) as Susan
The Legend of Hell House (1973) as Ann Barrett
Nuits rouges aka Shadowman (1974) 
The Spiral Staircase (1975) as Blanche
Strange Shadows in an Empty Room (1976) as Margie Cohn
The Sell Out (1976) as Deborah
Once in Paris... (1978) as Susan Townsend
The Saint and the Brave Goose (1979) as Annabelle West
Flashpoint Africa (1980) as Lisa Ford
The Million Dollar Face (1981 TV film) as Diana Masterson
Return of the Man from U.N.C.L.E. (1983 TV film) as Andrea Mackovich
Savage in the Orient (1983 TV film) as Julian Clydesdale
Two by Forsyth (1984 TV film)
Target (1985) as Donna Lloyd
Dream Lover (1986) as Claire
Turnaround (1987) as Pat
Silence Like Glass (1989) as Mrs. Martin
Hard to Be a God (1989)

Television

 The Beverly Hillbillies (TV series, 1966) She portrayed Emaline Fetty, a con woman trying to extort money from the Clampetts in two episodes.
 Get Smart: It Takes One to Know One (1966–67) as Octavia, a KAOS agent.
 The Golden Bowl (TV miniseries, 1972) as Charlotte Slant
 The Ripening Seed (1973) as Madame Dalleray
 Fall of Eagles (TV miniseries, 1974) as Tsarina Alexandra
 Thriller ("K Is for Killing", 1974) as Suzy Buckley
 Dylan (1978) as Liz Reitel
 Return of the Saint (1979) as Annabelle West
 A Man Called Intrepid (TV miniseries, 1979) as Cynthia
  (French TV miniseries, 1980's) as Lady Beltham
 The Martian Chronicles (TV miniseries, 1980) as Ruth Wilder
 The Love Boat (“The Mallory Quest/Julie, the Vamp/The Offer”, 1980) as Janet Mallory
 Taxi (1983) as Mrs. Bascome
 Tales of the Unexpected ("The Luncheon", 1983) as Susan Mandeville 
 The Adventures of Sherlock Holmes ("A Scandal In Bohemia", 1984) as Irene Adler
 The First Olympics: Athens 1896 (TV miniseries, 1984) as Mary Sloane
 A Woman of Substance (TV miniseries, 1985) as Olivia Wainright
 Strong Medicine (1986) as Lillian Hawthorne
 Dream West (TV miniseries, 1986) as Maria Crittenden
 Dallas (1989–1991) as Vanessa Beaumont
 The Saint: The Brazilian Connection (1989) as Mrs. Cunningham

References

External links
 

1943 births
20th-century American actresses
Actresses from Texas
American expatriate actresses in the United Kingdom
Female models from Texas
American film actresses
American health and wellness writers
American stage actresses
American television actresses
Living people
People from Fort Worth, Texas
University of California, Los Angeles alumni
Actresses from Fort Worth, Texas
American emigrants to England
Wives of knights